Reynaldo dos Santos Silva (born 24 August 1989), known as just Reynaldo, is a Brazilian retired professional footballer who played as a forward.

Career
Reynaldo began his career in the youth from Sport Club do Recife, before 2007 signed from Clube Náutico Capibaribe, he left after 1 year the club an signed at R.S.C. Anderlecht in Summer 2008. He left RSC Anderlecht in January 2010 to sign a loan deal with Cercle Brugge, until 30 June 2010, which was extended for another season. Reynaldo stayed with Anderlecht during the first half of the 2011–12 season, but was then loaned out again to Westerlo for the second part of the season. In February 2013 Reynaldo joined Qarabağ of the Azerbaijan Premier League.

On 27 January 2017, Reynaldo signed a 2.5-year contract with Süper Lig side Adanaspor.

On 10 January 2018, Reynaldo signed for Spartak Trnava until the end of the 2017/18 season, however on 1 February 2018, his contract was cancelled by mutual consent. On 27 February 2018, FC Aktobe announced the signing of Reynaldo.

On 19 December 2018, Qarabağ announced the return of Reynaldo on a -year contract, but was released early from his contract by mutual consent on 13 May 2019.

On 4 July 2019, Reynaldo signed for Irtysh Pavlodar. Less than twenty days later, 23 July 2019, Reynaldo left Irtysh Pavlodar by mutual consent.

After a spell at FC Dinamo Batumi in Georgia, Reynaldo announced his retirement on 28 January, 2021.

Career statistics

Club

Honors

Club
Anderlecht
Belgian Pro League (2): 2009–10, 2011–12

Qarabağ
Azerbaijan Premier League (4): 2013–14, 2014–15, 2015–16, 2018–19
Azerbaijan Cup (2): 2014–15, 2015–16

Individual
Azerbaijan Premier League Top Goalscorer (1): 2013–14

References

External links
Reynaldo player profile at the official RSCA website
Footgoal Profile

1989 births
Living people
Brazilian footballers
Brazilian expatriate footballers
Association football midfielders
Clube Náutico Capibaribe players
R.S.C. Anderlecht players
Sport Club do Recife players
Cercle Brugge K.S.V. players
K.V.C. Westerlo players
Qarabağ FK players
Adanaspor footballers
FC Aktobe players
FC Irtysh Pavlodar players
FC Dinamo Batumi players
Belgian Pro League players
Azerbaijan Premier League players
Süper Lig players
TFF First League players
Kazakhstan Premier League players
Erovnuli Liga players
Brazilian expatriate sportspeople in Belgium
Brazilian expatriate sportspeople in Azerbaijan
Brazilian expatriate sportspeople in Georgia (country)
Brazilian expatriate sportspeople in Kazakhstan
Brazilian expatriate sportspeople in Turkey
Brazilian expatriate sportspeople in Slovakia
Expatriate footballers in Belgium
Expatriate footballers in Azerbaijan
Expatriate footballers in Georgia (country)
Expatriate footballers in Kazakhstan
Expatriate footballers in Turkey
Expatriate footballers in Slovakia